The Auwers synthesis is a series of organic reactions forming a flavonol from a coumarone. This reaction was first reported by Karl von Auwers in 1908.

The first step in this procedure is an acid catalyzed aldol condensation between benzaldehyde and a 3-cyclooxapentanone to an o-hydroxychalcone. Bromination of the alkene group gives a dibromo-adduct which rearranges to the flavonol by reaction with potassium hydroxide.

Mechanism
A possible mechanism for the rearrangement step is shown below:

See also
 Algar–Flynn–Oyamada reaction
 Allan–Robinson reaction

References

Heterocycle forming reactions
Name reactions
Oxygen heterocycle forming reactions
Ring expansion reactions
Carbon-carbon bond forming reactions